Bimasakti is an Indonesian word that derived from bhima. may also refer to:

Sport
 Bima Sakti, retired Indonesian national football player
 Bimasakti Nikko Steel Malang, Basketball club that originally based in Malang

Other
 Galaksi Bima Sakti, Indonesian term for Milky Way